Money to Burn is a 1939 American comedy film directed by Gus Meins and written by Jack Townley. The film stars James Gleason, Lucile Gleason, Russell Gleason, Harry Davenport, Lois Ranson and Tommy Ryan. The film was released on December 31, 1939, by Republic Pictures.

Plot

Cast
James Gleason as Joe Higgins
Lucile Gleason as Lil Higgins
Russell Gleason as Sidney Higgins
Harry Davenport as Grandpa Ed Carson
Lois Ranson as Betty Higgins
Tommy Ryan as Tommy Higgins
Thurston Hall as Ellis
Winifred Harris as Mrs. Lucy Davis
Douglas Meins as Bill Davis
Lucien Littlefield as Irving
Herbert Rawlinson as Dover
Jack Rice as Thorne
Andrew Tombes as Brown
Gladys Blake as Miss Pitts
Jean Fenwick as Miss Murphy

References

External links
 

1939 films
American comedy films
1939 comedy films
Republic Pictures films
Films directed by Gus Meins
American black-and-white films
Films produced by Gus Meins
Films with screenplays by Jack Townley
1930s English-language films
1930s American films